The Tebicuarymí River is a river in the Paraguarí Department of Paraguay. It feeds into the Tebicuary River, which then terminates in the Paraguay River. The river flooded in 2019, displacing some nearby residents. The river is home to several species of fish, but is also subject to improper waste dumping.

See also 
List of rivers of Paraguay

References 

Rivers of Paraguay